The Crispi IV government of Italy held office from 14 June 1894 until 10 March 1896, a total of 635 days, or 1 year, 8 months and 25 days.

Government parties
The government was composed by the following parties:

Composition

References

Italian governments
1894 establishments in Italy